The News and Tribune (N&T) is a six-day (Monday through Saturday) daily newspaper serving Clark and Floyd counties in Indiana. It is owned by Community Newspaper Holdings Inc, and based out of Jeffersonville, Indiana. Aside from its flagship publication, the N&T also publishes SoIn, a Thursday entertainment feature, periodical business and fitness magazines, and annual election guides and government statistics guides. The N&T also publishes jail booking information for both counties Tuesday through Saturday, periodic police run information, and on Saturdays publishes church information, milestones, a listing of marriage license recipients, and a full-color comics section.

It was published as two different newspapers, The Evening News in Clark County and The Tribune in Floyd County, until March 2011, when the two papers merged. The two papers had shared certain resources, including a shared website, for several years prior to the merger. Offices are maintained in both counties; its Clark County headquarters, which also houses the main offices, are located at the former Evening News office on Spring Street, within the Old Jeffersonville Historic District, and its Floyd County headquarters are in the former Tribune office in New Albany.

The News and Tribune maintains a news gathering and reporting partnership with Louisville NBC affiliate WAVE.

References

External links 
 
 CNHI Website

Newspapers published in Indiana
New Albany, Indiana
Jeffersonville, Indiana
Publishing companies established in 1851
Publishing companies established in 2011
1851 establishments in Indiana
2011 establishments in Indiana